Megalorhipida dubiosa is a species of moth in the genus Megalorhipida known from Brazil. Moths of this species fly in September. The specific name "dubiosa" refers to doubts over the validity of the species.

References

Oxyptilini
Moths described in 2006
Endemic fauna of Brazil
Moths of South America
Taxa named by Cees Gielis